Indecent & Obscene is the second album by Dismember. The album is accompanied by two music videos for the tracks "Skinfather" and "Dreaming in Red". It's also their best-selling album to this day.

Track listing
All songs written by Matti Kärki and Fred Estby, except for where noted.

Dismember (band) albums
1993 albums
Nuclear Blast albums